Jonatas Oliveira Cardoso (born March 30, 1983 in São Paulo), or simply Jonatas, is a Brazilian striker. He currently plays for América-SP.

Honours
Paraná State League: 2005

Contract
Paraná (Loan) 1 March 2008 to 31 December 2008
Atlético-PR 2 August 2006 to 1 August 2009

References

External links

rubronegro 
 
furacao 
atleticopr 

1983 births
Living people
Brazilian footballers
Guarani FC players
Club Athletico Paranaense players
Figueirense FC players
Ituano FC players
Esporte Clube Santo André players
Paraná Clube players
Joinville Esporte Clube players
América Futebol Clube (SP) players
FC Metalurgi Rustavi players
Brazilian expatriate sportspeople in Georgia (country)
Brazilian expatriate footballers
Expatriate footballers in Georgia (country)
Footballers from São Paulo
Association football forwards